Eldon Square Bus Station is one of two bus stations serving Newcastle City Centre. It is owned by Newcastle City Council and is managed by Nexus. The new glass-roofed bus station was built adjacent to the old bus station, on a former access road, and is accessible via the new mall. 

It is located in the Haymarket area of the city centre, a short walk from Newcastle University and Northumbria University. It offers a connection with services from Haymarket Bus Station and Haymarket Metro Station. It is attached to, and accessible from Eldon Square Shopping Centre, which links the bus station with the Northumberland Street and Monument areas of the city.

History 
The present bus station opened in March 2007, replacing a previous bus station, located below the shopping centre, which has now been converted into a service area and new mall.

Stands and services
The station has ten bus stands, nine for departures (stand A to J), and an additional alighting point (stand K). The bus stands at Haymarket Bus Station continue the lettering sequence (stand L to Y). Each bus stand has ten seats, real-time information displays, and automatic doors (which open only when a bus is at the stand). Glass screens located at each bus stand feature artwork designed by Artstop Studios.

Eldon Square is mainly served by Go North East, with services operating in and around Gateshead, County Durham, Northumberland, Teesside and the Tyne Valley.

Stagecoach North East operate local services to the west of the city, including Kingston Park, Newcastle Airport, Ponteland and Throckley.

Arriva North East and Stagecoach Cumbria & North Lancashire jointly operate the Cross Pennine 685 service heading west to Hexham and Carlisle.

Buses from the nearby Haymarket Bus Station are predominantly operated by Arriva North East, and serve destinations in the north and east of the city, North Tyneside and Northumberland.

National Express coach services operate from Newcastle Coach Station, located on St. James Boulevard, with Megabus services operating from John Dobson Street.

, the stand allocation is:

References

External links 
 
 Map of stands and services for Eldon Square and Haymarket bus stations 

Tyne and Wear Passenger Transport Executive
Buildings and structures in Newcastle upon Tyne
Bus stations in Tyne and Wear
Transport in Newcastle upon Tyne